The Neoplan N4009 was a low-floor midibus built by Neoplan between 1988 and 1999, initially at Stuttgart in Germany and later also in Poland. It is the smaller version of the Neoplan N4016 full-size bus.

Specifications
It has a rounded roof dome similar to the N4016 and a double-curvature windscreen with a separately mounted destination sign. It typically seated 23 with a large standing capacity.

United Kingdom
Only three buses were sold in the United Kingdom. These were bought by MTL, Liverpool in 1995, and passed to MTL's successor Arriva North West & Wales in 2000. They were in service until 2008, when they were sold on to Heartlands Bus in the Midlands.

In mid to late 2010, the three right hand drive N4009s were scrapped and retired.

References
 Millar, Alan (2007) Bus & Coach Recognition : Ian Allan Ltd.,

External links

Low-floor buses
Midibuses
N4009
Vehicles introduced in 1988